Carlos Peliza Richards (born 30 August 2005) is a Gibraltarian professional footballer who plays as a winger for EFL League One club Derby County.

Club career
Richards is product of the youth academies of Chelsea and Derby County, having joined Derby County reserves  on 13 August 2021 after a stint at West Ham United. He worked his way up through Derby County's U18 and U23 sides, eventually moving to their first team in 2022. He made his professional debut with Derby County in a 2–1 EFL Championship win over Fulham on 15 April 2022, coming on as a late sub in the 90th minute.

International career
Richards is a youth international for Gibraltar, having been called up to the Gibraltar U17s in October 2021. He registered an assist on his debut, sending in a free-kick for Jaiden Bartolo to head home in an eventual 6–1 defeat to Bosnia and Herzegovina on 7 August 2021.

References

External links
 
 DCFC Profile

2005 births
Living people
Gibraltarian footballers
Gibraltar youth international footballers
Association football wingers
Derby County F.C. players
English Football League players